Toucan Do It Too is the third album by American country rock group the Amazing Rhythm Aces, released in 1977 on ABC Records. It reached #24 on the US country chart and #114 on the Billboard albums chart.

In 2000, Toucan Do It Too was reissued by the Special Products Division of Sony Music in the USA on a two-for-one CD which also contains the group's fourth album Burning the Ballroom Down.

Track listing 
 "Never Been to the Islands (Howard and Hugh's Blues)" (Butch McDade)
 "Never Been Hurt" (Russell Smith, James H. Brown Jr.)
 "Living in a World Unknown" (Russell Smith, James H. Brown Jr., Jeff Davis)
 "Everybody's Talked Too Much" (Russell Smith, James H. Brown Jr.)
 "Last Letter Home" (Butch McDade, James H. Brown Jr.)
 "Who's Crying Now" (Russell Smith)
 "Just Between You and Me and the Wall, You're a Fool" (James H. Brown Jr.)
 "I'm Setting You Free" (J. T. Watts, Harold Allen, Jimmy Grimes)
 "Geneva's Lullaby" (Russell Smith)
 "Two Can Do It Too" (Russell Smith)

References

The Amazing Rhythm Aces albums
ABC Records albums
1977 albums